This is a list of the National Register of Historic Places listings in San Augustine County, Texas.

This is intended to be a complete list of properties and districts listed on the National Register of Historic Places in San Augustine County, Texas. There are two districts and seven individual properties listed on the National Register in the county. One individually listed property is included within a State Historic Site while another is a State Antiquities Landmark. Five individually listed properties are Recorded Texas Historic Landmarks while an additional property and both districts contain several more.

Current listings

The publicly disclosed locations of National Register properties and districts may be seen in a mapping service provided.

|}

See also

National Register of Historic Places listings in Texas
Recorded Texas Historic Landmarks in San Augustine County

References

External links

Registered Historic Places
San Augustine County
Buildings and structures in San Augustine County, Texas